Duryard is an ancient area of Exeter in Devon, England. Duryard was once the hunting land of the Anglo-Saxon kings. The name comes from the Anglo-Saxon dear (deer) and geard (fold). Today, much of the area is occupied by the University of Exeter, which has a halls of residence named Duryard.

In popular culture 
This article was the topic of conversation in the third episode of series one of the web series "Two Of These People Are Lying" hosted by The Technical Difficulties.

References

Areas of Exeter